Masour Ousmane Dembélé (born 15 May 1997) is a French professional footballer who plays as a winger for La Liga club Barcelona and the France national team.

Dembélé began his career at Rennes before joining Borussia Dortmund in 2016. He won the DFB-Pokal with Dortmund in the 2016–17 season, scoring a goal in the final. A year later, he transferred to Barcelona for an initial fee of €105 million, becoming at the time the joint-second most expensive footballer ever alongside compatriot Paul Pogba. Dembélé subsequently won the double of La Liga and Copa del Rey in an injury-riddled first season in Spain.

After winning 20 caps and scoring five goals at youth level, Dembélé made his senior international debut for France in 2016. He was a member of the France squad that won the 2018 FIFA World Cup, also featuring at UEFA Euro 2020 and the 2022 World Cup.

Early life and career
Dembélé was born in Vernon, Eure, in Normandy. His mother is Mauritanian-Senegalese from Waly Diantang, while his father is Malian. He took his first footballing steps in nearby Évreux, first at ALM Évreux and then at Évreux FC 27 between the ages of 12 and 13.

Club career

Rennes

Dembélé made his senior debut for Rennes' reserve side in the Championnat de France Amateur, on 6 September 2014, coming on as a 78th-minute substitute for Zana Allée. He effectively set up Alseny Kourouma for the second goal of a 2–0 home win over the reserves of Breton rivals Guingamp. On 9 November, he scored his first career goal, again coming off the bench in a game at the Stade de la Piverdière, this time against the reserves of Laval. He totalled 13 goals in 18 games in his first season, including a hat-trick on 16 May 2015 in a 6–1 win over Hérouville.

On 6 November 2015, Dembélé made his professional debut for Rennes' first team in Ligue 1 against Angers, replacing Kamil Grosicki for the last five minutes of the game. On 22 November, he scored his first Ligue 1 goal for the first team against Bordeaux, opening a 2–2 draw at Roazhon Park. On 9 January 2016, Dembélé found the net again for Rennes, as they came from 0–2 down to draw 2–2 against regional rivals Lorient at home. On 6 March, he scored his first Ligue 1 hat-trick in a 4–1 victory over Nantes in the Derby Breton.

Rennes' sporting director Mikaël Silvestre compared Dembélé to Cristiano Ronaldo, who he had seen arrive at Manchester United around the same age.

Borussia Dortmund

On 12 May 2016, Dembélé signed a five-year contract with German club Borussia Dortmund, effective 1 July. On 14 August, he made his debut in a 2–0 defeat against Bayern Munich in the DFL-Supercup. He scored his first goal for Dortmund on 20 September, in a Bundesliga encounter against VfL Wolfsburg, which Dortmund won 5–1 at the Volkswagen Arena. On 22 November, he scored the first Champions League goal of his career as the German club defeated Legia Warsaw 8–4 in a group stage meeting.

On 26 April 2017, Dembélé assisted Aubameyang's goal and scored the 74th-minute winner against Bayern Munich in the DFB-Pokal's semi-final, helping Dortmund reach the cup final. In the decisive game on 27 May, he scored the first goal of a 2–1 victory as Dortmund clinched their first major title in five years by winning the 2017 DFB-Pokal Final against Eintracht Frankfurt. Dembélé was subsequently named man of the match. After the end of the season, Dembélé was named to the Bundesliga Team of the Season and awarded the league's Rookie of the Season award.

Barcelona

On 25 August 2017, La Liga side Barcelona announced that they had reached an agreement to sign Dembélé for €105 million plus a reported €40 million add-ons. On 28 August, he had his medical and signed a five-year contract, with his buyout clause set at €400 million. Barcelona had just sold Neymar to Paris Saint-Germain for €222 million, so the deal meant that Dembélé became the joint-second most expensive player (in euros), along with Paul Pogba. Rennes received a reported €20 million from Borussia Dortmund as a result of the sale, and Évreux 27 were also due part of the fee. He was handed the number 11 shirt previously worn by Neymar.

Dembélé made his debut on 9 September as a 68th-minute substitute for Gerard Deulofeu in a 5–0 Derbi barceloní win over Espanyol at the Camp Nou, assisting the final goal by Luis Suárez. In his first league start eight days later at Getafe, he injured his hamstring and was ruled out for four months. He was given the medical all-clear on 2 January 2018, but a couple weeks later, he again injured himself against Real Sociedad and was ruled out for up to four weeks.
On 14 March 2018, Dembélé scored his first goal for Barcelona, netting the second goal in a 3–0 second leg win in the Champions League round of 16 against Chelsea. On 17 April, he scored his first La Liga goal, the opening goal in an eventual 2–2 draw with Celta Vigo. On 9 May, Dembélé scored twice, marking the first brace of his Barcelona career, in a 5–1 home victory over Villarreal. Dembélé won both the Copa del Rey and La Liga winners' medals in his first season in Spain, with the 20-year-old scoring four goals in 24 appearances across all competitions.

On 12 August 2018, Dembélé scored the winning goal against Sevilla in the Supercopa de España, in an eventual 2–1 victory to win Barcelona their 13th Supercopa de España title. He opened his La Liga season's goal tally by scoring the only goal of the game against Real Valladolid, on 25 August, away at the Estadio José Zorrilla. On 18 September, Dembélé scored his first Champions League goal of the season, helping Barcelona beat PSV 4–0 at the Camp Nou. On 4 November, he inspired Barcelona to a 3–2 comeback away against Rayo Vallecano, scoring the 2–2 equaliser with a half-volley in the 87th minute. On 11 December, he scored a remarkable solo goal against Tottenham Hotspur outpacing many defenders, finishing with a cool left footed shot past Hugo Lloris. He won the UEFA Champions League Goal of the Week for that goal. After the match, Barcelona manager Ernesto Valverde praised the youngster, saying "He has made a great goal, within reach of players with his talent."

Dembélé injured his left hamstring in the opening match of the 2019–20 La Liga season, a 0–1 defeat against Athletic Bilbao, and was expected to miss five weeks. In February 2020, he suffered a serious hamstring tear and, following surgery, was not expected to return for six months. This would mean despite the extension of the season due to the COVID-19 pandemic, he would miss the rest of the season.

On 28 October 2020, Dembélé scored his first Champions League goal of the season in a 2–0 victory over Juventus.

On 10 May 2022, Dembélé provided two assists in a 3–1 home victory over Celta Vigo. It was his 10th and 11th league assists in 2022. He would finish the 2021–22 La Liga season as the league's top playmaker with 13 assists.

On 14 July 2022, Dembélé extended his contract with Barcelona until 30 June 2024.

International career

Dembélé was called up to the senior France squad for the first time to face Italy and Belarus in August 2016 after Alexandre Lacazette and Nabil Fekir withdrew through injury. He made his debut on 1 September against the former at the Stadio San Nicola, replacing Antoine Griezmann for the final 27 minutes of a 3–1 friendly win over Italy. On 13 June 2017, Dembélé scored his first France goal in a 3–2 friendly victory against England.

On 17 May 2018, he was called up to the 23-man French squad for the 2018 FIFA World Cup in Russia. On 15 July, he was an unused substitute as France beat Croatia 4–2 in the final.

Style of play
Dembélé is a winger who can play on either flank, due to his ability to use both feet, and to utilise his technical ability, speed, and agility in order to get past opponents or beat defenders in one-on-one situations. Dembélé can also operate as a left or right-sided attacking midfielder in a 4–4–2 or 3–5–2 formation. His clinical finishing and eye for goal also allow him to be deployed in a more offensive role as a striker. Dembélé also has great quality in terms of his shooting ability from distance.

Dembélé has received praise from former team captain Andrés Iniesta for his game-changing qualities. He is well-known for his ability to use either foot; a highly skilful player, his dribbling skills and ability to perform elaborate moves allow him to cut through from the left or right wing in order to score or create goalscoring opportunities for his teammates. The Frenchman is also an excellent crosser of the ball; moreover, his creativity is exceptional when in possession. Furthermore, his pace and intelligent runs make him a major offensive threat during counterattacks.

In March 2019, Barcelona president Josep Maria Bartomeu insisted that Dembélé, "is better than Neymar", who previously played for the club.

Personal life
Dembele is a practising Muslim. He married a Moroccan woman in a traditional Moroccan ceremony in France in December 2021. They have a daughter, born September 2022. He is a supporter of Premier League club Leeds United.

In July 2021, Dembélé was embroiled in a racism controversy, when video footage of him along with teammate Antoine Griezmann circulated online, in which he was seen making racial comments against the Asian technicians in their hotel room. As the technicians appeared to be troubleshooting the room's television, Dembélé made comments towards Griezmann in French, stating "All these ugly faces, just so you can play PES, aren't you ashamed?", continuing with "What the fuckin language?" before zooming in while laughing on one of the technicians' faces, mentioning "Are you technologically advanced in your country or not?".

Career statistics

Club

International

Scores and results list France's goal tally first, score column indicates score after each Dembélé goal

Honours
Borussia Dortmund
DFB-Pokal: 2016–17

Barcelona
La Liga: 2017–18, 2018–19
Copa del Rey: 2017–18, 2020–21
Supercopa de España: 2018, 2022–23

France
FIFA World Cup: 2018; runner-up: 2022

Individual
Ligue 1 Young Player of the Year: 2015–16
UNFP Player of the Month: March 2016
UEFA Champions League Breakthrough XI: 2016
Bundesliga Rookie of the Season: 2016–17
Bundesliga Team of the Season: 2016–17
VDV Newcomer of the Season: 2016–17

Orders
Knight of the Legion of Honour: 2018

References

External links

Profile at the FC Barcelona website

1997 births
Living people
People from Vernon, Eure
Sportspeople from Eure
Footballers from Normandy
French footballers
Association football wingers
Évreux FC 27 players
Stade Rennais F.C. players
Borussia Dortmund players
FC Barcelona players
Ligue 1 players
Bundesliga players
La Liga players
France youth international footballers
France under-21 international footballers
France international footballers
French expatriate footballers
Expatriate footballers in Germany
Expatriate footballers in Spain
French expatriate sportspeople in Germany
French expatriate sportspeople in Spain
2018 FIFA World Cup players
UEFA Euro 2020 players
2022 FIFA World Cup players
FIFA World Cup-winning players
Black French sportspeople
French Muslims
French sportspeople of Malian descent
French sportspeople of Mauritanian descent
French sportspeople of Senegalese descent
Chevaliers of the Légion d'honneur